The Athenaeum of Ohio – Mount St. Mary's Seminary of the West, originally St. Francis Xavier Seminary, is a Catholic seminary in Cincinnati, Ohio. It is the third-oldest Catholic seminary in the United States and was established by Edward D. Fenwick, the first Bishop of Cincinnati, in 1829 along with The Athenaeum (later Xavier University and St. Xavier High School), which opened in 1831 in downtown Cincinnati.

The Athenaeum of Ohio is accredited by the Higher Learning Commission of the North Central Association of Colleges and Schools and by the Association of Theological Schools in the United States and Canada.

History

St. Francis Xavier Seminary
In 1829 Bishop Fenwick founded St. Francis Xavier Seminary in the former Christ Church in Cincinnati. Two years later, he established the Athenaeum to educate lay students. In 1840, the Jesuits took over operation of the Athenaeum and renamed it St. Xavier College.

Mount St. Mary's of the West
On October 2, 1851 a new seminary building was dedicated by Archbishop John Baptist Purcell in Price Hill, Cincinnati and the seminary was renamed Mount St. Mary's of the West. The new name was selected in honor of Mount St. Mary’s of the East in Emmitsburg, Maryland, where Archbishop Purcell had been rector. In 1879, the seminary closed for eight years due to financial difficulty. When it reopened, the Archbishop decided to create a separate preparatory school, St. Gregory’s Seminary, which was opened in Mount Washington in 1890.

In 1906, Archbishop Henry K. Moeller had a mission to build a new cathedral, Archbishop's residence and seminary in Cincinnati. Groundbreaking on the seminary did not occur until 1921, with dedication in 1923.

Athenaeum of Ohio: Mount St. Mary's Seminary
In 1925, Archbishop John T. McNicholas developed a unified agency to coordinate all educational work in the diocese. This new organization was incorporated under the laws of Ohio as the Athenaeum of Ohio in March, 1928. The incorporation restored the name of the early college and seminary, founded by Bishop Fenwick in 1829. The Athenaeum of Ohio was chartered to grant degrees for Mount St. Mary’s of the West and St. Gregory seminaries, a teachers’ college and a graduate school of science, the Institutum Divi Thomae.

Mount St. Mary's of the West moved to the St. Gregory location in 1981 after the St. Gregory's Seminary was forced to close due to declining enrollment in 1980.  The Norwood site now houses Our Lady of the Holy Spirit Center, a retreat facility, for the Archdiocese of Cincinnati.

In October 2019, Mount St. Mary’s Seminary & School of Theology opened a new residence building, Fenwick Hall at the Mount Washington campus. The building also has meeting and classrooms to host ongoing or secondary formation throughout the summer months.

The Athenaeum of Ohio-Mount St. Mary’s Seminary includes a pastoral counseling program. It also has an agreement with the University of Cincinnati for ROTC candidates.

Alumni
 Francis William Howard - Bishop of Covington
 John Luers -  Bishop of Fort Wayne
 Nicholas Chrysostom Matz - Bishop of Denver
 Michael William Warfel - Bishop of Great Falls–Billings 
 Earl Kenneth Fernandes - Bishop of Columbus

Notes

References

External links

 

Educational institutions established in 1829
Greater Cincinnati Consortium of Colleges and Universities
Catholic seminaries in the United States
Universities and colleges in Cincinnati
Roman Catholic Archdiocese of Cincinnati